This is a list of notable people from Pasadena, California.

Academia 

 Richard Feynman, Nobel Prize physicist, Caltech professor, raconteur
 Murray Gell-Mann, Nobel Prize physicist, Caltech
 George Ellery Hale, astrophysicist, Caltech professor, founder Mount Wilson Observatory
 Edwin Hubble, astronomer, namesake for the Hubble Space Telescope, Caltech professor
 Todd M. Hutton, American medical academic and psychiatrist.
 F.O. Matthiessen, Rhodes Scholar, Harvard professor
 Robert A. Millikan, Nobel Prize physicist
 Brian Stoltz, Professor of organic chemistry at Caltech
 George Olah, Nobel Prize chemist, professor University of Southern California
 Linus Pauling, Nobel Prize-winning chemist, peace activist, Caltech
 Roger Revelle, founder of University of California, San Diego, father of concept of global warming
 William Shockley, Nobel Prize physicist, Caltech professor, inventor of the transistor
 Kip Thorne, professor, Feynman theoretical physicist, Caltech

Artists and designers 

 Benjamin Chambers Brown, artist
 Howell Chambers Brown, artist
 Sigrid Burton, artist and painter
 Edward Cucuel, impressionistic painter 
 Rafa Esparza, performance artist
 A.B. Frost (1851-1928), American illustrator and painter
 Elmer Grey, architect
 Tom Jancar, contemporary art dealer Jancar Kuhlenschmidt Gallery
 Hugo Markl, artist, curator and creative director based in New York
 Jane Mulfinger, conceptual artist and educator
 R. Kenton Nelson, painter. 
 Stan Sakai, cartoonist best known as creator of Usagi Yojimbo series

Entertainers (TV/Film) 
This is a partial list of actors, actresses, comedians, film producers, filmmakers, and television personalities.

 Kelly Asbury, film director, writer, illustrator, voice actor
 Meredith Baxter, actress
 Walt Becker, film director 
 Summer Bishil, actress
 Whitney Blake, actress, director and producer
 Alison Brie, actress
 Betty Brosmer, bodybuilder, model
 Sophia Bush, actress, TV series One Tree Hill and Chicago P.D., 82nd Rose Queen for 111th Tournament of Roses Parade (2000)
 Stephen Cannell, author, television and film producer
 Christy Canyon, pornographic actress
 Cari Champion, former moderator, ESPN First Take
 Jimmy Dore, comedian
 Michael Dorn, actor
 Cullen Douglas, actor, director, playwright
 Arthur Duncan, tap dancer
 Mary Beth Evans, actress
 Sally Field, two-time Academy Award-winning actress.
 W.C. Fields, comedian, actor, juggler and writer; died in Pasadena.
 Stan Freberg, comedian, satirist, recording artist.
 Harry Hamlin, actor
 Michelle Horn, actress
 Bret Iwan, fourth voice of Mickey Mouse
 Tamala Jones, actress
 Matthew Lillard, actor
 Kate Linder, actress
 Joel McCrea, actor
 Richard Moll, actor
 Mandy Moore, actress, musician
 George Nader, actor
 Drew Pinsky, doctor and radio/TV personality
 Chris Pontius, actor/TV personality 
 Karen Price, actress
 Kathleen Quinlan, actress
 Robert Reed, actor, best known as Mike Brady in The Brady Bunch television series
 George Reeves, actor, best known as star of television series Adventures of Superman; attended Pasadena Junior College.
 Christian Serratos, actress
 Jamey Sheridan, actor
 John Singleton, film director
 Kathleen Sullivan, television personality
 Charles Walters, film director
 Wil Wheaton, actor, writer
 Jaleel White, actor, producer, and writer

Entertainers (musicians) 
This is a partial list of musicians, song writers singers, and band members.

 Jon B., Grammy-nominated R&B singer-songwriter.
 Hodgy Beats, rapper
 Phoebe Bridgers, singer-songwriter, guitarist, and producer
 Dâm-Funk, musician
 Pete Jolly, jazz pianist
 David Lee Roth, lead singer for Van Halen
 Ruwanga Samath, record producer, attended John Muir High School
 Alina Smith, musician
 Phil Spector, music producer
 Teena Marie, singer-songwriter, music producer
 Troop, R&B group
 Alex Van Halen, drummer for Van Halen
 Eddie Van Halen, lead guitarist for Van Halen
 Marc Yu, child music prodigy on piano and viola

Politician 
This is a partial list of politicians and judges.

 Lance Ito, judge, Los Angeles Superior Court
 Henry Markham (1840-1934), lawyer, politician, 18th governor of California. Resident of Pasadena.
 Bill Paparian, attorney, veterans' advocate and Mayor of Pasadena.
 Bill Richardson, governor of New Mexico
 James Roosevelt, U.S. Congressman, son of President Franklin Delano Roosevelt

Sports 

 Stacey Augmon, basketball player
 Myles Bryant, professional football player
 Susie Maxwell Berning, pro golfer
 May Sutton Bundy (1886–1975), first American to win Wimbledon tennis singles title
 Jeff Cirillo, MLB player for six teams
 Michael Cooper, NBA player for Los Angeles Lakers, coach
 Lillian Copeland (1904–1964), Olympic discus champion; set world records in discus, javelin, and shot put
 Tyler Dorsey (born 1996), Greek–American basketball player in the Israeli Basketball Premier League
 Darrell Evans, MLB player
 Missy Franklin, swimmer, 5-time Olympic gold medalist
 Kristy Hawkins, IFBB professional bodybuilder
Mary Ann Hawkins, surfer, swimmer and stunt double
 Charles Frederick Holder, inventor of big-game fishing and a founder of Pasadena's Tournament of Roses
 Chris McAlister, professional football player
 James McAlister, professional football player
 Mo Martin, LPGA golfer, 2014 British Open champion
 Inger Miller, track and field sprint athlete
 George Murdoch, WWE wrestler
 Tracy Murray, NBA Player
 Chris Pettit, MLB outfielder
 Durell Price, UCLA fullback
 Jackie Robinson, civil rights icon and Hall of Fame baseball player
 Mack Robinson, Olympic athlete, brother of Jackie Robinson
 Don Ross, Major League Baseball player
 Mark Smith, MLB player for five teams
 Stan Smith, professional tennis player, namesake of Stan Smith Tennis Shoe
 Brett Sterling, professional ice hockey player
 Brian Teacher, Australian Open tennis champion
 Lester Towns, professional football player
 Chase Utley, baseball player, Los Angeles Dodgers
 Peter Vagenas, soccer player
 Jacque Vaughn, professional basketball player.
 Avery Williams, running back for the Atlanta Falcons
 Matt Young, MLB player for Boston Red Sox, Los Angeles Dodgers and Cleveland Indians.
 Jeff Yurak, MLB player for Milwaukee Brewers

Writers and journalists 

 Carlton Beals (1893–1979), journalist
 Julie Berry, children's author
 Octavia Butler, award-winning science-fiction writer
 Otis Chandler, publisher, Los Angeles Times
 Justin Chapman, journalist, author, actor
 Julia Child, celebrated author and television chef
 Andre Coleman, Award-winning journalist and screenwriter
 Winifred Starr Dobyns, author of California Gardens (1931)
 Harriet Doerr, author, winner of the National Book Award
 David Ebershoff, writer
 Paul Fussell, critic and historian
 TJ Kirk, commentator and author
 Kathryn Le Veque, author
 Ottessa Moshfegh, author

Others 

 G. Vernon Bennett, Los Angeles City Council member, 1935–49
 Owen Brown (abolitionist) (1824–1889), son of John Brown, along with his brother Jason, his sister Ruth Brown Thompson, a teacher, and her husband
 Frederick Russell Burnham (1861–1947), celebrated scout and inspiration for the Boy Scouts
 Howard Burnham (1870–1917), mining engineer and spy
 Steve Crocker, internet engineer, member of the Internet Hall of Fame
 Olive Hoskins, first woman promoted to warrant officer in U.S. Army
 Gregory C. Horn, U.S. Navy Rear Admiral
 Myron Hunt, architect of Rose Bowl
 Howard W. Hunter, 14th president of the Church of Jesus Christ of Latter-day Saints
 Joseph J. Jacobs, engineer and founder of Jacobs Engineering Group
 Lucy Jones, seismologist
 Florence E. Kollock (1848–1925), Universalist minister and lecturer
 Jack Parsons, rocket scientist and occultist
 George S. Patton (attorney) (1856–1927), city attorney (1877) for City of Pasadena
 George S. Patton, four-star general, led Allies during World War II
 George F. Regas, rector of All Saints Episcopal Church 1967–1995, noted critic of U.S. involvement in Vietnam war as well as many other policy issues
 Ellen Browning Scripps, heiress, publisher, philanthropist
 Alvin Simon, restaurateur who revitalized Old Pasadena
 Sirhan Sirhan, resident of Pasadena at the time of assassination of Senator Robert F. Kennedy
 John Patten Story, U.S. Army major general
 Bertha L. Turner caterer, cookbook author, and community leader in Pasadena; active within the National Federation of Colored Women
 John Van De Kamp, attorney general of California
 Duong Van Minh, exiled president of South Vietnam
 William Wrigley, Jr., founder of Wrigley Chewing Gum, former owner of Chicago Cubs

See also

References

Pasadena, California
 
Pasadena